Lord Dark Wind (Professor Kenji Oyama) is a fictional character appearing in American comic books published by Marvel Comics. He is the father of X-Men supervillainess Lady Deathstrike and Lord Deathstrike and the inventor of the adamantium bonding process.

Publication history

The character first appeared in Daredevil #196 (July 1983). He was created by Denny O'Neil, Larry Hama, and Klaus Janson.

Fictional character biography
Professor Kenji Oyama was a Japanese scientist who was also a powerful crime lord known as Lord Dark Wind. Kenji is most famous for inventing the adamantium-to-bone bonding process that would be used on Wolverine, Bullseye, and others. He is also the father of Yuriko Oyama, the woman who would later become Lady Deathstrike, and Lord Deathstrike/Kazou Oyama,  a Japanese mobster, later killed by Punisher.

A Japanese kamikaze pilot during World War II, the bombs on his plane failed to explode when he crashed into an American aircraft carrier, and he miraculously survived, though his face was horribly scarred. He wrote a book about his experiences and made a fortune from its sales, which he used to buy a private island and set himself up as a lord. During this time he married and had three children. Feeling shamed by his failure decades earlier, he permanentally adorned his face with a black cowl and scarred the faces of his children in a ritual design. Seeing mercantilism as inherently dishonorable, he began funding violent political activity, and ordered his two sons to assassinate the Japanese Prime Minister; they died in the attempt.

Intending to employ the assassin Bullseye, he freed him from prison and performed surgeries to replace the damaged bone in his vertebrae with adamantium. Daredevil pursued Bullseye to his estate. His daughter Yuriko allied herself with Daredevil. To free her lover, Kiro, from her father's servitude, and to gain vengeance for her scarring and the death of her two brothers, she slew Lord Dark Wind. Yuriko would later belatedly embrace her father's ideals and go on a quest to track down the person who dishonored him.

During the "Hunt for Wolverine" storyline, Lady Deathstrike, Sabretooth, and Daken fight their way past zombies and soldiers from Soteira Killteam Nine to get to the power station where a glowing green device suspected to be responsible for the zombie outbreak is located. Lady Deathstrike discovers that one of the soldiers is a resurrected version of her father. After Lord Dark Wind stabs Lady Deathstrike, Daken fights him until he gets stabbed as well. Sabretooth gets Daken's defeated body away from Lord Dark Wind. Lady Deathstrike recovers and continues her fight against her father until he slices off her left hand. After stabbing Lord Dark Wind in the neck, Lady Deathstrike discovers that the adamantium they were tracking was his adamantium sword.

In other media

Television
 In the X-Men episode "Out of the Past: Part 1", Professor Oyama  (an amalgamation of Lord Dark Wind and Andre Thornton) first appears. Oyama was evidently killed during Wolverine's rampage through the Weapon-X facility, causing his daughter Yuriko/Lady Deathstrike to seek revenge.
 Kenji Oyama appears in Daredevil, portrayed by Glenn Kubota and credited as Dr. O. In the third season finale "A New Napkin", he is a doctor operating on Ben Poindexter after his spine is crushed. Oyama explains to his assistant that the spine is made of "cogmium" steel, unaware that his patient is awake.

Video games
 Lord Dark Wind is mentioned by Yuriko in X2: Wolverine's Revenge.

References

External links
 
 

Characters created by Dennis O'Neil
Characters created by Klaus Janson
Comics characters introduced in 1983
Fictional crime bosses
Fictional inventors
Fictional Japanese military personnel
Fictional naval aviators
Fictional surgeons
Fictional swordfighters in comics
Fictional World War II veterans
Kamikaze in fiction
Marvel Comics male supervillains
Marvel Comics martial artists
Marvel Comics military personnel